Harry Leo Basch (January 16, 1926 – June 23, 2020) was an American actor and author. In 1951 he appeared in "Mr. Roberts" at the Curran Theatre in San Francisco. He is possibly best known for his role as Vince Caproni in the 1980s television series Falcon Crest.

Basch appeared in Falcon Crest from 1982 to 1984. He also appeared as  Dr. Brown in  the Star Trek episode "What Are Little Girls Made Of?" in 1966.

In addition to acting, Basch wrote several articles for the Los Angeles Times about traveling. He and his wife, actress Shirley Slater, also wrote several books on the subject including RV Vacations for Dummies.

In the 1950s, Basch was married to actress Leesa Troy.

Filmography

Film
 A Man Called Gannon (1968) – Ben
 Winning (1969) – The Stranger (uncredited)
 The Gang That Couldn't Shoot Straight (1971) – DeLauria
 They Only Kill Their Masters (1972) – Mayor Wendell
 The Stone Killer (1973) – Mossman
 Swashbuckler (1976) – Banana Man
 Rollercoaster (1977) – Owner #3
 Coma (1978) – Second Doctor
 F.I.S.T. (1978) – Network Announcer

Television

 General Hospital (Unknown episodes, 1963) – Armistead (1983)
 Dr. Kildare (1 episode, 1965) – Dr. Milton Bremner
 Honey West (1 episode, 1965) – Mr. Flowers
 Get Smart (3 episodes, 1965–1969) – Lucheck / Stromberg / Kaos Leader
 Burke's Law (2 episodes, 1966) – Harlan O'Brien / O'Brien
 Blue Light (1 episode, 1966) – Mueller
 Star Trek (1966, Episode: "What Are Little Girls Made Of?") – Brown
 The F.B.I. (2 episodes, 1966) – Hotel Manager / Albertson
 Mission: Impossible (2 episodes, 1966–1968) – Nicolai / Konya
 Gunsmoke (1 episode, 1967) – Milt Agnew
 Ironside (1967, TV Movie) – Man Finding Ironside (uncredited)
 Daniel Boone (2 episodes, 1968) – Jesse Watts / The Stranger
 The Mod Squad (4 episodes, 1968–1970) – Dr. Berger / Eddie / Dr. Brandon, Psychologist
 Mannix (2 episodes, 1968–1974) – Sam Vincent / Gould
 That Girl (3 episodes, 1969–1970) – Man in Elevator / Charlie / Driver
 The Love War (1970, TV Movie) – Bal
 Bonanza (1 episode, 1972) – Prosecutor
 Sanford and Son (1 episode, 1974) – Dr. Jamison
 Nakia (1 episode, 1974) – George Cook
 Mary Hartman, Mary Hartman (1 episode, 1976) – Clyde Muncie / Engineer
 Holmes & Yo-Yo (1 episode, 1976) – Tony Papas
 Carter Country (1 episode, 1977) – Harris
 Quincy, M.E. (1 episode, 1979) – Judge
 The Waltons (1 episode, 1980) – Arthur Harrington
 Tenspeed and Brown Shoe (1 episode, 1980) – Molina
 Falcon Crest (11 episodes, 1982–1984) – Vince Caproni
 The Wizard (1 episode, 1987) – Mr. Perato

References

External links
 

1926 births
2020 deaths
20th-century American male actors
Actors from Trenton, New Jersey
American male film actors
American male television actors
Male actors from New Jersey
Writers from New Jersey